The Unemployed Workmen Act 1905 was first passed by the Conservative Party (UK) in 1903 and later renewed by the Liberal Party (UK) in 1905. It established Distress Committees that gave out single grants to businesses or local authorities to allow them to hire more workers to decrease the number of people out of work. However, those with a criminal record were not given the opportunity to work the businesses being given grants.

See also
Liberal reforms
Liberal Party (UK)
List of Acts of Parliament in the United Kingdom

United Kingdom Acts of Parliament 1905